The 2001 Internazionali Femminili di Palermo was a women's tennis tournament played on outdoor clay courts in Palermo, Italy that was part of the Tier V category of the 2001 WTA Tour. It was the 14th edition of the Internazionali Femminili di Palermo and took place from 9 July until 15 July 2001. Ninth-seeded Anabel Medina Garrigues won the singles title and earned $16,000 first-prize money.

Finals

Singles
 Anabel Medina Garrigues defeated  Cristina Torrens Valero, 6–4, 6–4
It was Medina Garrigues's first singles title of her career.

Doubles
 Tathiana Garbin /  Janette Husárová defeated  María José Martínez Sánchez /  Anabel Medina Garrigues, 4–6, 6–2, 6–4

References

External sources
 ITF tournament edition details
 Tournament draws

Torneo Internazionali Femminili di Palermo
Torneo Internazionali Femminili di Palermo
Internazionali Femminili di Palermo
Torneo